The Diocese of Székesfehérvár is a diocese located in the city of Székesfehérvár in the ecclesiastical province of Esztergom-Budapest in Hungary.

History
 16 June 1777: Established as Diocese of Székesfehérvár from the Diocese of Veszprém and Diocese of Győr by Queen Maria Theresa

Special churches
Basilica: Cathedral Basilica of St. Stephen the King, Székesfehérvár

Leadership
 2003– Antal Spányi (1950)
 1991–2003 Jusztin Nándor Takács (1927–2016)
 1982–1991 Gyula Szakos (1916–1992)
 1968–1982 Imre Kisberk (1906–1982)
 1927–1968 Lajos Shvoy (1879–1968)
 1905–1927 Ottokár Prohászka (1858–1927)
 1901–1905 Gyula Városy (1846–1910)
 1890–1900 Fülöp Steiner (1830–1900)
 1878–1889 János Pauer (1814–1889)
 1875–1877 Nándor Dulánszky (1829–1896)
 1867–1874 Vince Jekelfalussy (1802–1874)
 1851–1866 Imre Farkas (1788–1866)
 1848 Antal Karner (1794–1856)
 1837–1847 László Barkóczy (1792–1847)
 1830–1835 János Horváth (1769–1835)
 1827–1830 Pál Mátyás Szusits (1767–1834)
 1821–1825 József Kopácsy (1775–1847)
 1816–1820 József Vurum (1763–1838)
 1790–1811 Bertalan Miklós Milassin (1736–1811)
 1777–1789 Ignác Nagy (1733–1789)

See also
Roman Catholicism in Hungary

References

Sources
 GCatholic.org
 Catholic Hierarchy

External links

 

1770s establishments in the Habsburg monarchy
18th-century establishments in Hungary
Dioceses established in the 18th century
Religious organizations established in 1777
Roman Catholic dioceses in Hungary
Roman Catholic Ecclesiastical Province of Esztergom–Budapest
Székesfehérvár